Répcevis is a village in Győr-Moson-Sopron county, Hungary.

External links 
 Street map 
 The website of the Parish of Répcevis

Populated places in Győr-Moson-Sopron County